Skygate is an outdoor 1985 stainless steel sculpture by Roger Barr, installed along the Embarcadero in San Francisco, California, in the United States. The sculpture was the first piece of public art along the Embarcadero.

References

External links

 
 Skygate - San Francisco, CA at Waymarking
 Sculpture Skygate by Roger Barr along Embarcadero, San Francisco, California at the Library of Congress

1985 establishments in California
1985 sculptures
North Beach, San Francisco
Outdoor sculptures in San Francisco
Stainless steel sculptures in the United States
Steel sculptures in California